Amniomancy is a method of divination whereby the future life of a child is predicted from the caul covering their head at birth. The colour and consistency of the caul are used to interpret the future. A vivid colour is supposed to reflect a vivid life whilst the opposite is also true. 

The word amniomancy comes from the Latin , meaning membrane. The French proverb  is thought to originate from this practice.

References

Divination